Central African Patriotic Movement (MPC) is a rebel group in the Central African Republic based in nortwestern part of the country.

History 
MPC was formed in July 2015 by Mahamat Al-Khatim. In October 2016 they were accused in taking part in attack which killed 37 civilians, however Al-Khatim denied these claims. In May 2018 MNLC leader, Ahmat Bahar announced that his group was merging with MPC. On 17 December 2020 MPC joined Coalition of Patriots for Change.

References 

Factions of the Central African Republic Civil War
Rebel groups in the Central African Republic
Rebel groups that actively control territory